Robert Lettis Hooper or Robert Lettice Hooper (died 1738/39) was a chief justice of the New Jersey Supreme Court.

Biography
Robert Lettis Hooper was a son of Daniel Hooper, a native of Barbados.

A merchant in New York City, he subsequently relocated to New Jersey. He was Warden of St. Peter's Church, Perth Amboy in 1726, and Vestryman from 1734 to 1738.

Robert Lettis Hooper was elected to the eighth New Jersey General Assembly (1721-1725 Legislative Session), representing the Somerset County Constituency.  He was commissioned as Chief Justice of the New Jersey Supreme Court on January 1, 1724/5 (O. S.) and took the bench on March 30, 1725. Hooper would serve as Chief Justice until his death, with the exception of a brief interruption in 1728, when Gov. William Burnet had named Thomas Farmar to the post; Hooper was reinstated the following year.

One of the more prominent cases heard by the Hooper Court was Lithgow v. Schuyler in 1734, in which the East New Jersey Proprietors attempt to oust a settler from land in Elizabethtown was defeated by a jury.

On November 16, 1738 he was commissioned of the New Jersey Provincial Council, but would only serve briefly before his death.

Robert Lettis Hooper made his will on January 27, 1738; it was proved February 19, 1738/39.

Family
Hooper married Mrs. Sarah Graham in 1701 in New York.  They had three children including Robert Lettis, James and Isabella. A grandson, Robert Lettis Hooper, Jr., would serve the Patriot cause in the American Revolutionary War, and would serve as Vice President of the New Jersey Legislative Council.

References

External links
Robert Lettis Hooper, Deputy Quarter-Master General in the Continental Army and Vice-President of New Jersey

1739 deaths
People from Somerset County, New Jersey
Politicians from Perth Amboy, New Jersey
Members of the New Jersey General Assembly
Members of the New Jersey Provincial Council
Chief Justices of the Supreme Court of New Jersey
Justices of the Supreme Court of New Jersey
American people of English descent
Barbadian people of English descent
American people of Barbadian descent